Liber Niger ("Black Book") may refer to:

 The Liber Niger Alani, a cartulary of the Anglican archdiocese of Dublin by John Alen (1476–1534), Archbishop of Ireland
The Liber Niger of Holy Trinity or Christ Church cathedral, Dublin, a 13th-century manuscript brought to Dublin by Henry de la Warre, prior of  Holy Trinity, Dublin (1301-12/13) and added to subsequently. 
 The Liber Niger, the management manual of the English royal households during the Houses of York and Tudor, from the reign of Edward IV through the reign of Henry VIII
 Letter-Book B, also known as the Liber Niger, the second of the Letter-Books of the City of London, recording the business of the City from 1275–1298
 Liber Niger Scutarii ("Black Book of the Exchequer"), containing reports by county on feudal holdings in England in 1166 (reign of Henry II)
The Liber Niger of Peterborough Abbey, similar to a cartulary but with miscellaneous contents. It was compiled in the 13th century but contains copies of materials from the 7th century onwards, and is now Society of Antiquaries ms. 60.

See also 
 Black Book (disambiguation)